7166 Kennedy, provisional designation , is a stony Nysian asteroid from the inner regions of the asteroid belt, approximately 5 kilometers in diameter. It was discovered on 15 October 1985, by American astronomer Edward Bowell at Lowell's Anderson Mesa Station near Flagstaff, Arizona, in the United States. The asteroid was named after Malcolm Kennedy of the Astronomical Society of Glasgow.

Orbit and classification 

Kennedy is a member of the Nysa family, the largest asteroid family of the main belt, consisting of stony and carbonaceous subfamilies. The family, named after 44 Nysa, is located in the inner belt near the Kirkwood gap (3:1 orbital resonance with Jupiter), a depleted zone that separates the central main belt. It is, however, a non-family asteroid from the main belt's background population when applying the hierarchical clustering method to its proper orbital elements.

It orbits the Sun in the inner main-belt at a distance of 2.1–2.8 AU once every 3 years and 9 months (1,384 days). Its orbit has an eccentricity of 0.13 and an inclination of 4° with respect to the ecliptic. The body's observation arc begins with a precovery taken at Palomar Observatory in June 1954, more than 31 years prior to its official discovery observation at Anderson Mesa.

Physical characteristics 

Kennedy has been characterized as a common stony S-type asteroid by PanSTARRS photometric survey.

Rotation period 

In December 2012, a rotational lightcurve of Kennedy was obtained from photometric observations in the R-band by astronomers at the Palomar Transient Factory in California. Lightcurve analysis gave a rotation period of 3.659 hours with a brightness amplitude of 0.52 magnitude.

Diameter and albedo 

According to the survey carried out by the NEOWISE mission of NASA's Wide-field Infrared Survey Explorer, Kennedy measures 5.129 kilometers in diameter and its surface has an albedo of 0.267, while the Collaborative Asteroid Lightcurve Link assumes an albedo of 0.21 and calculates a diameter of 4.42 kilometers based on an absolute magnitude of 14.08.

Naming 

This minor planet was named in memory of Malcolm Kennedy (1944–1997), secretary of the Astronomical Society of Glasgow. He was born and raised in New Zealand and became a civil engineer in Scotland. The official naming citation was published by the Minor Planet Center on 8 August 1998.

References

External links 
 Asteroids related to the Astronomical Society of Glasgow, archived website
 Find 7166 Kennedy in the night sky
 Asteroid Lightcurve Database (LCDB), query form (info )
 Dictionary of Minor Planet Names, Google books
 Asteroids and comets rotation curves, CdR – Observatoire de Genève, Raoul Behrend
 Discovery Circumstances: Numbered Minor Planets (5001)-(10000) – Minor Planet Center
 
 

007166
Discoveries by Edward L. G. Bowell
Named minor planets
19851015